The Shape of Jazz to Come is the third album by jazz musician Ornette Coleman. Released on Atlantic Records in 1959, it was his debut on the label and his first album featuring the working quartet including himself, trumpeter Don Cherry, bassist Charlie Haden, and drummer Billy Higgins. The recording session for the album took place on May 22, 1959, at Radio Recorders in Hollywood, California. Although Coleman initially wished for the album to be titled Focus on Sanity after the LP's fourth track, Atlantic producer Nesuhi Ertegun suggested the final title, feeling that it would give consumers "an idea about the uniqueness of the LP."

In 2012, the Library of Congress added the album to the National Recording Registry. The album was included in the Rolling Stone list of the 500 greatest albums of all time. AllMusic called it one of the 20 essential free jazz albums. The album was inducted into the Grammy Hall of Fame in 2015.

Background
From 1948 to 1958, Coleman moved between New Orleans, Fort Worth, and Los Angeles, working various jobs and developing his own unique sound that was often met with hostility. His unique approach to jazz initially made it difficult to make ends meet by playing music. While employed as an elevator operator in Los Angeles, he studied music theory and harmony and developed an idiosyncratic take on country blues and folk forms.

Coleman's big break came in Los Angeles when he caught the attention of bassist Percy Heath and pianist John Lewis of the Modern Jazz Quartet. Lewis encouraged Coleman and his trumpeter Don Cherry to attend the Lenox School of Jazz (a seminal summer jazz education program) in Massachusetts in 1959, at which Lewis was the director. Lewis also secured Coleman a deal with Atlantic Records, who paid his tuition at the Lenox School of Jazz. Though both Coleman and Cherry were already rather accomplished by this point in their careers, Lewis wanted to use their attendance at the Lenox School of Jazz to generate buzz amongst jazz circles. Their presence at the school was not without friction amongst students and faculty alike, but in the end, their attending the school accomplished what Lewis hoped to achieve. After his stint at the Lenox School of Jazz, Coleman was booked by Lewis to play at the 1959 Monterey Jazz Festival in California.

These were all pivotal events in Coleman's career, who in June 1959 suggested to Nesuhi Ertegun, who handled Atlantic's jazz recordings, that he was considering abandoning music in order to study religion. Ertegun, confident of Coleman's potential, urged him to reconsider.

Content
Coleman's quartet, like Gerry Mulligan's, was unusual in that it did not employ a chordal instrument such as a piano or guitar. Each composition contains a brief thematic statement, then several minutes of free improvisation, followed by a repetition of the main theme. While this resembles the conventional head-solo-head structure of bebop, it abandons the use of chord structures. The Shape of Jazz to Come found Coleman and his quartet elaborating on the sound and themes he had been developing throughout his career.

One prominent feature of Coleman's signature sound was that he played a plastic Grafton saxophone, which some feel contributed to the harshness of his timbre. He coined the term "harmolodic", a combination of harmony, movement, and melody, to describe his philosophy of improvisation which heavily emphasized melody rather than harmony. It was early in his career, in an attempt to further emphasize focus on melody over harmony, that he stopped including a piano as a part of his ensembles.

Coleman continues with this tradition on The Shape of Jazz to Come, dispensing with harmonic accompaniment and focusing solely on improvised melodies and variations on themes and motifs. Coleman had a unique approach to pitch as well. His use of microtonal intervals was central to his sound, and he even went as far as to suggest that the same pitch should sound different when played in different contexts, stating that "jazz is the only music in which the same note can be played night after night, but differently each time". The album was a breakthrough and helped to establish the free jazz movement. Later avant-garde jazz was often very different from this, but the work helped to lay the foundation upon which much subsequent avant-garde and free jazz would be built.

"Lonely Woman"

The album contains one of the few Coleman compositions to achieve jazz standard status, "Lonely Woman". Coleman was moved to compose the song when, while on a lunch break from his job in a department store stock room in Los Angeles in the early 1950s, he came across a photograph of a woman in a gallery. Coleman describes the photograph as follows: In the background there was everything you could imagine that was wealthy – all in her background – but she was so sad. And I said, 'Oh my goodness. I understand this feeling. I have not experienced this wealth, but I understand the feeling.' I went home and wrote 'Lonely Woman'... I related the condition to myself, wrote this song, and ever since it has grown and grown and grown.

Fred Kaplan wrote:'Lonely Woman' begins with Haden playing a slow bass dirge. Higgins follows with a fast drum riff (a pairing of slow bass and fast drums was unusual enough). Then Coleman and Cherry, in unison, blow a sorrowful melody, both of them bending notes, wailing, so naked with emotion that it still raises shivers a half century later. After reciting the theme a couple times, Coleman takes his solo, which wanders off in a different direction; if you were expecting to hear an improvisation on harmony, it might seem like a different song. But he's improvising on other aspects of the song, especially its emotion. The other players do the same. Somehow it all hangs together, and toward the end, they come back to the theme, come back down to Earth, with aplomb.

Release and reception

On November 17, 1959, shortly after the release of the album, Coleman's quartet began its residency at the Five Spot. This engagement was arranged by John Lewis and was initially scheduled to last two weeks; it was eventually extended to  months. The performances were well attended and generated controversy amongst attendees, critics, and jazz musicians alike. Some musicians and critics praised Coleman for an inventiveness not seen since the emergence of be-bop, including Charles Mingus, who said "It’s like organized disorganization or playing wrong right. It gets to you emotionally like a drummer." Others, including Miles Davis, were unimpressed by Coleman's music.

The album was ranked number 246 in Rolling Stone magazine's 2003 list of the 500 greatest albums of all time.  The album's rank dropped to number 248 in the 2012 update of the list, and to number 417 in the 2020 update. The album was identified by Chris Kelsey in his AllMusic essay "Free Jazz: A Subjective History" as one of the 20 Essential Free Jazz Albums. In its ninth edition, The Penguin Guide to Jazz awarded the album a "crown" accolade, in addition to a four star rating. The album was inducted into the Grammy Hall of Fame in 2015.

Two outtakes from the session, "Monk and the Nun" and "Just for You", would later be released respectively on the 1970s compilations Twins and The Art of the Improvisers.

Track listing
All compositions by Ornette Coleman.

Side one

Side two

Personnel
 Ornette Coleman – alto saxophone
 Don Cherry – cornet
 Charlie Haden – bass
 Billy Higgins – drums

See also
The Shape of Things to Come
The Shape of Punk to Come

References

1959 albums
Albums produced by Nesuhi Ertegun
Atlantic Records albums
Avant-garde jazz albums
Free jazz albums
Ornette Coleman albums
United States National Recording Registry recordings
United States National Recording Registry albums
Albums recorded at Radio Recorders